Mohamed Koné (born March 24, 1981) is an Ivorian–French professional basketball player currently playing for Charleville-Mézières of the LNB Pro B. He is also a member of the Côte d'Ivoire national basketball team.

Kone spent one year playing NCAA Division I basketball at Valparaiso University after transferring from the College of Southern Idaho, whom he led to a third-place finish in the nation at the junior college level in 2004–05.  He averaged 10.9 PPG and 8 RPG in 27 games for the Crusaders.  At Valparaiso, Kone came under some scrutiny during an NCAA investigation regarding his travel to Valparaiso's campus before enrolling as a student, resulting in him missing a handful of midseason games.

After his college career, Kone moved to play professional basketball in France, spending one year playing for ÉS Chalon-sur-Saône and another playing for Chorale Roanne Basket.  At Roanne, Kone helped lead the team to the semifinals of the 2008 French La Semaine des As Cup by averaging 4.9 points and 4.6 rebounds per game during the season.  Kone announced he would play the 2009 season in Turkey on July 20, 2009.

In July 2010 he signed a one-year contract with Lagun Aro GBC in Spain.

On November 2, 2014 he signed with Lebanese club Champville.

Kone helped lead his native Côte d'Ivoire national basketball team to a silver medal at the 2009 FIBA Africa Championship, its first podium finish since 1985.  Kone averaged 10.2 PPG and 8.3 RPG in nine games of action throughout the tournament.

References

1981 births
Living people
Aix Maurienne Savoie Basket players
CB Lucentum Alicante players
Chorale Roanne Basket players
Élan Chalon players
Erdemirspor players
ESSM Le Portel players
Étoile Charleville-Mézières players
Foolad Mahan Isfahan BC players
French expatriate basketball people in Spain
French expatriate basketball people in the United States
French men's basketball players
Gipuzkoa Basket players
Ivorian expatriate sportspeople in Turkey
Ivorian expatriates in the United States
Ivorian men's basketball players
Liga ACB players
Power forwards (basketball)
Southern Idaho Golden Eagles men's basketball players
Sportspeople from Abidjan
Valparaiso Beacons men's basketball players
2010 FIBA World Championship players
2019 FIBA Basketball World Cup players